The Light welterweight (64 kg) competition at the 2018 AIBA Women's World Boxing Championships was held from 16 to 24 November 2018.

Draw

References

External links
Draw

Light welterweight